The Forwood Baronetcy, of The Priory, Gateacre, in the parish of Childwall in the County Palatine of Lancaster, was a title in the Baronetage of the United Kingdom. It was created on 5 September 1895 for the Conservative politician Sir Arthur Forwood, 1st Baronet, son of wealthy merchant Thomas Friend Brittain Peploe Forwood, and brother of Sir William Bower Forwood and Ernest Harrison Forwood. He served as Parliamentary and Financial Secretary to the Admiralty from 1886 to 1892. The Forwood Baronetcy became extinct on the death of the fourth Baronet in 2019.

Forwood baronets, of The Priory (1895)
Sir Arthur Bower Forwood, 1st Baronet (1836–1898)
Sir Dudley Baines Forwood, 2nd Baronet (1875–1961)
Sir Dudley Richard Forwood, 3rd Baronet (1912–2001)
Sir Peter Noel Forwood, 4th Baronet (1925–2019)

Arms

References

Kidd, Charles, Williamson, David (editors). Debrett's Peerage and Baronetage (1990 edition). New York: St Martin's Press, 1990.

Forwood